El Bebedero is a corregimiento in Tonosí District, Los Santos Province, Panama with a population of 1,332 as of 2010. Its population as of 1990 was 1,227; its population as of 2000 was 1,389.

References

Corregimientos of Los Santos Province